Split Island is one of the Falkland Islands. It is near West Falkland, to its west, at the mouth of King George Bay. It is to the west of Rabbit Island, Hummock Island and Middle Island. It is north of the Passage Islands and south east of Westpoint Island, and south west of the Byron Heights and Storm Mountain.

References

External links 
 http://www.falklandislands.com/

Islands of the Falkland Islands